Energy Transfer Upconversion or ETU is a physical principle (most commonly encountered in solid-state laser physics) that involves the excitation of a laser-active ion to a level above that which would be achieved by simple absorption of a pump photon, the required additional energy being transferred from another laser-active ion undergoing nonradiative deexcitation.   

ETU involves two fundamental ideas: energy transfer and upconversion. The analysis below will discuss ETU in the context of an optically pumped [see optical pumping] solid-state laser.

A solid-state laser [see also laser] has laser-active ions embedded in a host medium. Energy may be transferred between these by dipole-dipole interaction (over short distances) or by fluorescence and reabsorption (over longer distances). In the case of ETU it is primarily dipole-dipole energy transfer that is of interest.

If a laser-active ion is in an excited state, it can decay to a lower state either radiatively (i.e. energy is conserved by the emission of a photon, as required for laser operation) or nonradiatively. Nonradiative emission may be via Auger decay or via energy transfer to another laser-active ion. If this occurs, the ion receiving the energy will be excited to a higher energy state than that already achieved by absorption of a pump photon. This process of further exciting an already excited laser-active ion is known as photon upconversion.

ETU is normally an unwanted effect when building lasers. Nonradiative decay is itself an inefficiency (in a perfect laser every downward transition would be a stimulated emission event), whilst the excitation of the energy-receiving ion can result in heating of the gain medium. When ETU occurs due to a clustering of ions within the host medium, it is sometimes termed concentration quenching.

References

Solid-state lasers